Emotional Playground is the fourth and last studio album to date by Finnish thrash metal band Stone, released in 1991. While still retaining thrash and progressive influences, this album saw greater experimentation compared to Stone's previous works. Emotional Playground also marked the first Stone album that was not produced by Mikko Karmila; instead it was produced by the band themselves.

Track listing 

 "Mad Hatter's Den"/"Emotional Playground" (1991) was released as a promotional single from the album.

Personnel 
 Janne Joutsenniemi – bass, vocals
 Nirri Niiranen – guitar
 Roope Latvala – guitar
 Pekka Kasari – drums

References 

1991 albums
Stone (band) albums